James Alexander McClymont CBE VD (1848–1927) was a Scottish minister who served as Moderator of the General Assembly of the Church of Scotland in 1921.

Life
He was Principal Chaplain to the Royal Army Chaplains' Department in the First World War.

His duties as Moderator in 1921/22 included unveiling the stained glass windows at St Laurence Church in Forres.

In 1924 a sermon by McClymont on the "League of Nations" was broadcast from Edinburgh on radio by the BBC.

Publications

The New Testament and its Writers (1899)
Greece (1906), illustrations by John Fulleylove
The New Century Bible: St John (1930)

References

1848 births
1927 deaths
20th-century Ministers of the Church of Scotland
Moderators of the General Assembly of the Church of Scotland
Commanders of the Order of the British Empire
19th-century Ministers of the Church of Scotland